The Future is the second studio album by American R&B group Guy, released in November 13, 1990, on Uptown Records. It was their last album before their reunion a decade later.

Background 
The Future had a much darker tone in stark contrast to their debut. Most of it had to do with things going on behind the scenes. A year after the release of their debut album, they fired their manager Gene Griffin—who they claimed allocated funds from the group.  This revelation angered all of the members, and particularly infuriated lead singer Aaron Hall—so much so that he didn't sing on half of the album. Hall revealed:

"There came a time where I just did not want to sing a single note. To be honest, it was the money. It just became too depressing. We were the biggest group in the world and we were flat broke. It took its toll".

As a result, Teddy Riley assumed the duties of lead vocals for the remainder of The Future.

Also on a tour with their MCA labelmates New Edition, things got out of hand between the two acts. Although New Edition were headliners, Guy happened to upstage them a few dates into the tour. This created a rivalry backstage that turned deadly. One of New Edition's production managers Ronald Boyd shot and killed Anthony Bee—a member of Guy's security detail. Guy would dedicate the song "Long Gone" to the memory of Bee- as well as Wreckx-n-Effect member Brandon Mitchell, who was also killed in the same year. The Future contained songs where they attacked their former manager Gene Griffin and his then-proteges, Motown Records recording group Basic Black. By the time they released the fifth single "Let's Stay Together" in early 1992, Guy called it quits and embarked on separate endeavors, with Aaron and Damion Hall releasing solo albums and Riley starting the group Blackstreet.

Covers 

A couple of the songs from The Future have been covered. Priority Records singer Toni Estes covered the song "Let's Chill" from her 2000 debut Two Eleven. Singer Charlie Wilson also covered "Let's Chill" from his 2005 album Charlie, Last Name Wilson. R&B singer Case covered the song "Smile" on his 2009 album The Rose Experience.

Release and reception 

The Future peaked at sixteen on the U.S. Billboard 200 and reached number one on the R&B Albums chart. By January 1991, it was certified platinum in sales by the RIAA after sales exceeding one million copies in the United States.

Although Alex Henderson of AllMusic felt The Future was not as strong an album as its predecessor, he still gave a positive note to the work, calling it "one of the more appealing—and certainly more authentic—examples of "new jack swing."

Track listing 

"Where Did The Love Go", "Yearning for Your Love" and "Smile" are not available on the vinyl release of The Future.
"Wanna Get With U" [Club Version] is not available on the cassette release of The Future.

Personnel 
Credits adapted from the CD liner notes.

Vocals 
 Tammy Lucas – background vocals (7, 11, 15)
 Mary Brown – background vocals (7, 15)
 Marsha McClurkin – background vocals (15)

Technical 
 Teddy Riley – producer, all instruments, programming
 Guy – co-producers (1-3, 5-7, 9-16), background vocals (1-3, 5, 7, 10, 11, 13-16)
 Aaron Hall – co-producer (8), keyboards (6, 12, 14)
 Wreckx-N-Effect – co-producers (9), background vocals (1, 9)
 Bernard Belle – co-producer (5, 12), background vocals (5, 15)
 David "DJ" Wynn & Steve "Cut Technician" Thomas – scratching
 Dave Way – engineer, mixing at Soundworks Studio, New York City
 Mike Fossenkemper, Jim Kvoriack, Rich July, Kevin Kelly, Scott Canto, Dave Lebowitz – assistant engineers
 Chris Trevett – additional mixing (1, 5, 9)
 Herb Powers – mastering at Hit Factory, New York City

Artwork 
 Carol Kim – personal assistant
 Jeannie Bradshaw – art direction and design
 Todd Gray – photography
 Stuart Wilson – logo and additional photography
 Keith Holman – stylist
 Guy & Charles Darrisaw – hair stylists
 La-Lette Littlejohn – makeup
 Sammy & Mike at Gallery 2000 – jewelry

Charts

Weekly charts

Year-end charts

References

External links 
 
 The Future at Discogs

See also 
List of number-one R&B albums of 1991 (U.S.)

1990 albums
Albums produced by Teddy Riley
Guy (band) albums
MCA Records albums
Uptown Records albums